Bantia is the ancient name for the town of Banzi in Italy. 

Bantia may also refer to:
Bantia (gens), a Roman family
Bantia (mantis), a genus of praying mantises